In 1965, Chinese scientists first synthesized crystalline bovine insulin, which was the first functional crystalline protein being fully synthesized in the world. Research on synthesizing bovine insulin started on 1958. Members in the research group were from the Chemistry Department of Beijing University, Shanghai Institute of Biochemistry, CAS and Shanghai Institute of Organic Chemistry, CAS.

Insulin is a protein (peptide) consisting of two chain, A and B. Chain A consists of 21 amino acid residues while chain consists of 30 amino acid residues. The main function of insulin is to regulate the concentrate of sugar in blood. Type 1 diabetes are caused by dysfunction on the synthesis or secretory of insulin while injecting insulin can treat type 1 diabetes.

In 1979, Wang Yinglai, the project's lead scientist, nominated Niu Jingyi, a team member who had made significant contributions, for the Nobel Chemistry Prize, but the nomination was unsuccessful.

See also
Helmut Zahn
Panayotis Katsoyannis
Cell-free protein synthesis

References

Biochemistry
1965 in China
Chinese inventions